The following are the national records in Olympic weightlifting in France. Records are maintained in each weight class for the snatch lift, clean and jerk lift, and the total for both lifts by the French Weightlifting Federation (Fédération française d'Haltérophilie) (FFH).

Current records
Key to tables:

Men

Women

Historical records

Men (1998–2018)

Women (1998–2018)

References
General
French records 31 December 2022 updated
Specific

External links
French Weightlifting Federation web site
Historical records – Men
Historical records – Women

France
records
Olympic weightlifting
weightlifting